Rubén Duarte Casillas (born 1 April 1967) is a Mexican football manager and former player.

External links
 
 
 

1968 births
Living people
Footballers from Guanajuato
Mexican footballers
Atlas F.C. footballers
Mexican football managers
Association football midfielders
Atlas F.C. managers
Atlas F.C. non-playing staff